Gloss is a 2007 Russian satirical melodrama directed by Andrei Konchalovsky. The picture opened the 2007 Kinotavr film festival, and was part of the competition program.

Plot
Galya, a young worker in a provincial factory, dreams of becoming a successful model. One day she leaves her alcoholic parents together with her violent boyfriend and goes to Moscow. She ends up getting hired by a great couturier as a seamstress. During one of their shows, she walks the runway as a model, which causes her to be fired on the spot. Then, seemingly by chance, she becomes the assistant of the owner of a highly exclusive matchmaking agency, which arranges marriages for rich men with the most beautiful models in Moscow. Galya, who only thinks of a career, advances in this world of luxury and money and will do everything to achieve her goals.

Cast
Julia Vysotskaya — Galya Sokolova
Juris Lauciņš — Fedor, father of Galya
Efim Shifrin — Mark Schiffer, fashion designer
Aleksei Serebryakov — Stasis
Gennady Smirnov — Petya, the owner of the model agency
Irina Rozanova — Marina Yurievna, editor of the glossy magazine
Aleksandr Domogarov — Misha Klimenko
Olga Arntgolts — Nastya
Tatyana Arntgolts — Oksana
Olga Miloyanina — Jeanne
Alexei Grishin — director
Artemy Troitsky — thief in the law
Alexey Kolgan — Volodya
Fyodor Bondarchuk
Gosha Kutsenko
Alexander Ilyin — Mikula
Sergei Makovetsky
Andrey Noskov — Gleb
Yola Sanko — Galya's mother
Nikolai Fomenko
Elena Drobysheva
Yana Poplavskaya
Ilya Isaev — Viteok
Elena Perova
Oleg Komarov
Vladimir Shiryaev
Elmira Tuyusheva — Ingeborge
Yuliya Snigir — model
Galina Stakhanova — old weaver

Production
The film was shot in Montenegro, Moscow and Rostov.

References

External links

Глянец / Gloss - Andrei Konchalovsky's official website

Films directed by Andrei Konchalovsky
Russian romantic comedy films
Russian satirical films
2007 romantic comedy films
2007 films
2000s satirical films
Films set in Moscow
Films about modeling